Materna is the original title of the music to the song "America the Beautiful".

Materna may also refer to:

Eudocima materna, a moth of the family Noctuidae
Materna coat of arms from the Polish-Lithuanian Commonwealth
 Materna (film), a 2020 American drama film
Amalie Materna (1844–1918), Austrian operatic soprano
Anna Catharina Materna (1731–1757), Danish actress and playwright
Friedrich Materna (1885–1946), German general
Jerzy Materna (born 1956), Polish politician